Misr University may refer to:

Misr International University, an undergraduate private university located in the suburbs of Cairo, Egypt